PGU may refer to:

 First Chief Directorate, the foreign operations division of the KGB in the Soviet Union
 Peninsula Gas Utilisation, a 1,700-kilometre pipeline in Malaysia
 Perm State University, a university in Russia
 Persian Gulf Airport, an airport in ‘Asalūyeh, Iran; IATA code PGU
 Persian Gulf University, a university in Būshehr, Iran
 Phillips Graduate University, a graduate school in Los Angeles, California
 WPGU, a college radio station at the University of Illinois at Urbana–Champaign, United States

Educational institution disambiguation pages